Pseudochrobactrum saccharolyticum is a bacterium from the genus of Paenochrobactrum which was isolated from industrial glue.

References

External links
Type strain of Pseudochrobactrum saccharolyticum at BacDive -  the Bacterial Diversity Metadatabase

Hyphomicrobiales
Bacteria described in 2006